Urmince is a municipality in the Topoľčany District of the Nitra Region, Slovakia. It lies approximately 679 ft above sea level. In 2011 it had 1408 inhabitants.

References

External links
http://en.e-obce.sk/obec/urmince/urmince.html
http://www.urmince.sk.html

Villages and municipalities in Topoľčany District